There are many relationships among the uniform polyhedra. The Wythoff construction is able to construct almost all of the uniform polyhedra from the acute and obtuse Schwarz triangles. The numbers that can be used for the sides of a non-dihedral acute or obtuse Schwarz triangle that does not necessarily lead to only degenerate uniform polyhedra are 2, 3, 3/2, 4, 4/3, 5, 5/2, 5/3, and 5/4 (but numbers with numerator 4 and those with numerator 5 may not occur together). (4/2 can also be used, but only leads to degenerate uniform polyhedra as 4 and 2 have a common factor.) There are 44 such Schwarz triangles (5 with tetrahedral symmetry, 7 with octahedral symmetry and 32 with icosahedral symmetry), which, together with the infinite family of dihedral Schwarz triangles, can form almost all of the non-degenerate uniform polyhedra. Many degenerate uniform polyhedra, with completely coincident vertices, edges, or faces, may also be generated by the Wythoff construction, and those that arise from Schwarz triangles not using 4/2 are also given in the tables below along with their non-degenerate counterparts. Reflex Schwarz triangles have not been included, as they simply create duplicates or degenerates; however, a few are mentioned outside the tables due to their application to three of the snub polyhedra.

There are a few non-Wythoffian uniform polyhedra, which no Schwarz triangles can generate; however, most of them can be generated using the Wythoff construction as double covers (the non-Wythoffian polyhedron is covered twice instead of once) or with several additional coinciding faces that must be discarded to leave no more than two faces at every edge (see Omnitruncated polyhedron#Other even-sided nonconvex polyhedra). Such polyhedra are marked by an asterisk in this list. The only uniform polyhedra which still fail to be generated by the Wythoff construction are the great dirhombicosidodecahedron and the great disnub dirhombidodecahedron.

Each tiling of Schwarz triangles on a sphere may cover the sphere only once, or it may instead wind round the sphere a whole number of times, crossing itself in the process. The number of times the tiling winds round the sphere is the density of the tiling, and is denoted μ.

Jonathan Bowers' short names for the polyhedra, known as Bowers acronyms, are used instead of the full names for the polyhedra to save space. The Maeder index is also given. Except for the dihedral Schwarz triangles, the Schwarz triangles are ordered by their densities.

The analogous cases of Euclidean tilings are also listed, and those of hyperbolic tilings briefly and incompletely discussed.

Möbius and Schwarz triangles 

There are 4 spherical triangles with angles π/p, π/q, π/r, where (p q r) are integers: (Coxeter, "Uniform polyhedra", 1954)
 (2 2 r) - Dihedral
 (2 3 3) - Tetrahedral
 (2 3 4) - Octahedral
 (2 3 5) - Icosahedral

These are called Möbius triangles.

In addition Schwarz triangles consider (p q r) which are rational numbers. Each of these can be classified in one of the 4 sets above.

Although a polyhedron usually has the same density as the Schwarz triangle it is generated from, this is not always the case. Firstly, polyhedra that have faces passing through the centre of the model (including the hemipolyhedra, great dirhombicosidodecahedron, and great disnub dirhombidodecahedron) do not have a well-defined density. Secondly, the distortion necessary to recover uniformity when changing a spherical polyhedron to its planar counterpart can push faces through the centre of the polyhedron and back out the other side, changing the density. This happens in the following cases:
The great truncated cuboctahedron, 2 3 4/3 |. While the Schwarz triangle (2 3 4/3) has density 7, recovering uniformity pushes the eight hexagons through the centre, yielding density |7 − 8| = 1, the same as that of the colunar Schwarz triangle (2 3 4) that shares the same great circles.
The truncated dodecadodecahedron, 2 5/3 5 |. While the Schwarz triangle (2 5/3 5) has density 9, recovering uniformity pushes the twelve decagons through the centre, yielding density |9 − 12| = 3, the same as that of the colunar Schwarz triangle (2 5/2 5) that shares the same great circles.
Three snub polyhedra: the great icosahedron | 2 3/2 3/2, the small retrosnub icosicosidodecahedron | 3/2 3/2 5/2, and the great retrosnub icosidodecahedron | 2 3/2 5/3. Here the vertex figures have been distorted into pentagrams or hexagrams rather than pentagons or hexagons, pushing all the snub triangles through the centre and yielding densities of |5 − 12| = 7, |22 − 60| = 38, and |23 − 60| = 37 respectively. These densities are the same as those of colunar reflex-angled Schwarz triangles that are not included above. Thus the great icosahedron may be considered to come from (2/3 3 3) or (2 3 3/4), the small retrosnub icosicosidodecahedron from (3 3 5/8) or (3 3/4 5/3), and the great retrosnub icosidodecahedron from (2/3 3 5/2), (2 3/4 5/3), or (2 3 5/7). (Coxeter, "Uniform polyhedra", 1954)

Summary table 

There are seven generator points with each set of p,q,r (and a few special forms):

There are four special cases:
 p q   – This is a mixture of p q r  and p q s . Both the symbols p q r  and p q s  generate a common base polyhedron with some extra faces. The notation p q   then represents the base polyhedron, made up of the faces common to both p q r  and p q s .
  p q r – Snub forms (alternated) are given this otherwise unused symbol.
  p q r s – A unique snub form for U75 that isn't Wythoff-constructible using triangular fundamental domains. Four numbers are included in this Wythoff symbol as this polyhedron has a tetragonal spherical fundamental domain.
  (p) q (r) s – A unique snub form for Skilling's figure that isn't Wythoff-constructible.

This conversion table from Wythoff symbol to vertex configuration fails for the exceptional five polyhedra listed above whose densities do not match the densities of their generating Schwarz triangle tessellations. In these cases the vertex figure is highly distorted to achieve uniformity with flat faces: in the first two cases it is an obtuse triangle instead of an acute triangle, and in the last three it is a pentagram or hexagram instead of a pentagon or hexagon, winding around the centre twice. This results in some faces being pushed right through the polyhedron when compared with the topologically equivalent forms without the vertex figure distortion and coming out retrograde on the other side.

In the tables below, red backgrounds mark degenerate polyhedra. Green backgrounds mark the convex uniform polyhedra.

Dihedral (prismatic)
In dihedral Schwarz triangles, two of the numbers are 2, and the third may be any rational number strictly greater than 1.

(2 2 n/d) – degenerate if gcd(n, d) > 1.

Many of the polyhedra with dihedral symmetry have digon faces that make them degenerate polyhedra (e.g. dihedra and hosohedra). Columns of the table that only give degenerate uniform polyhedra are not included: special degenerate cases (only in the (2 2 2) Schwarz triangle) are marked with a large cross. Uniform crossed antiprisms with a base {p} where p < 3/2 cannot exist as their vertex figures would violate the triangular inequality; these are also marked with a large cross. The 3/2-crossed antiprism (trirp) is degenerate, being flat in Euclidean space, and is also marked with a large cross. The Schwarz triangles (2 2 n/d) are listed here only when gcd(n, d) = 1, as they otherwise result in only degenerate uniform polyhedra.

The list below gives all possible cases where n ≤ 6.

Tetrahedral
In tetrahedral Schwarz triangles, the maximum numerator allowed is 3.

Octahedral
In octahedral Schwarz triangles, the maximum numerator allowed is 4. There also exist octahedral Schwarz triangles which use 4/2 as a number, but these only lead to degenerate uniform polyhedra as 4 and 2 have a common factor.

Icosahedral
In icosahedral Schwarz triangles, the maximum numerator allowed is 5. Additionally, the numerator 4 cannot be used at all in icosahedral Schwarz triangles, although numerators 2 and 3 are allowed. (If 4 and 5 could occur together in some Schwarz triangle, they would have to do so in some Möbius triangle as well; but this is impossible as (2 4 5) is a hyperbolic triangle, not a spherical one.)

Non-Wythoffian

Hemi forms
Apart from the octahemioctahedron, the hemipolyhedra are generated as double coverings by the Wythoff construction.

Reduced forms
These polyhedra are generated with extra faces by the Wythoff construction.

The tetrahemihexahedron (thah, U4) is also a reduced version of the {3/2}-cupola (retrograde triangular cupola, ratricu) by {6/2}. As such it may also be called the crossed triangular cuploid.

Many cases above are derived from degenerate omnitruncated polyhedra p q r . In these cases, two distinct degenerate cases p q r  and p q s  can be generated from the same p and q; the result has faces {2p}'s, {2q}'s, and coinciding {2r}'s or {2s}'s respectively. These both yield the same nondegenerate uniform polyhedra when the coinciding faces are discarded, which Coxeter symbolised p q  . These cases are listed below:

In the small and great rhombihexahedra, the fraction 4/2 is used despite it not being in lowest terms. While 2 4 2  and 2 4/3 2  represent a single octagonal or octagrammic prism respectively, 2 4 4/2  and 2 4/3 4/2  represent three such prisms, which share some of their square faces (precisely those doubled up to produce {8/2}'s). These {8/2}'s appear with fourfold and not twofold rotational symmetry, justifying the use of 4/2 instead of 2.

Other forms
These two uniform polyhedra cannot be generated at all by the Wythoff construction. This is the set of uniform polyhedra commonly described as the "non-Wythoffians". Instead of the triangular fundamental domains of the Wythoffian uniform polyhedra, these two polyhedra have tetragonal fundamental domains.

Skilling's figure is not given an index in Maeder's list due to it being an exotic uniform polyhedron, with ridges (edges in the 3D case) completely coincident. This is also true of some of the degenerate polyhedron included in the above list, such as the small complex icosidodecahedron. This interpretation of edges being coincident allows these figures to have two faces per edge: not doubling the edges would give them 4, 6, 8, 10 or 12 faces meeting at an edge,  figures that are usually excluded as uniform polyhedra. Skilling's figure has 4 faces meeting at some edges.

Both of these special polyhedra may be derived from the great snub dodecicosidodecahedron,  3 5/3 5/2 (U64). This is a chiral snub polyhedron, but its pentagrams appear in coplanar pairs. Combining one copy of this polyhedron with its enantiomorph, the pentagrams coincide and may be removed. As the edges of this polyhedron's vertex figure include three sides of a square, with the fourth side being contributed by its enantiomorph, we see that the resulting polyhedron is in fact the compound of twenty octahedra. Each of these octahedra contain one pair of parallel faces that stem from a fully symmetric triangle of  3 5/3 5/2, while the other three come from the original  3 5/3 5/2's snub triangles. Additionally, each octahedron can be replaced by the tetrahemihexahedron with the same edges and vertices. Taking the fully symmetric triangles in the octahedra, the original coinciding pentagrams in the great snub dodecicosidodecahedra, and the equatorial squares of the tetrahemihexahedra together yields the great dirhombicosidodecahedron (Miller's monster).  Taking the snub triangles of the octahedra instead yields the great disnub dirhombidodecahedron (Skilling's figure).

Euclidean tilings
The only plane triangles that tile the plane once over are (3 3 3), (4 2 4), and (3 2 6): they are respectively the equilateral triangle, the 45-45-90 right isosceles triangle, and the 30-60-90 right triangle. It follows that any plane triangle tiling the plane multiple times must be built up from multiple copies of one of these. The only possibility is the 30-30-120 obtuse isosceles triangle (3/2 6 6) = (6 2 3) + (2 6 3) tiling the plane twice over. Each triangle counts twice with opposite orientations, with a branch point at the 120° vertices.

The tiling {∞,2} made from two apeirogons is not accepted, because its faces meet at more than one edge. Here ∞' denotes the retrograde counterpart to ∞.

The degenerate named forms are:
chatit: compound of 3 hexagonal tilings + triangular tiling
chata: compound of 3 hexagonal tilings + triangular tiling + double covers of apeirogons along all edge sequences
cha: compound of 3 hexagonal tilings + double covers of apeirogons along all edge sequences
cosa: square tiling + double covers of apeirogons along all edge sequences

The tiling 6 6/5 | ∞ is generated as a double cover by Wythoff's construction:

Also there are a few tilings with the mixed symbol p q  |:

There are also some non-Wythoffian tilings:

The set of uniform tilings of the plane is not proved to be complete, unlike the set of uniform polyhedra. The tilings above represent all found by Coxeter, Longuet-Higgins, and Miller in their 1954 paper on uniform polyhedra. They conjectured that the lists were complete: this was proven by Sopov in 1970 for the uniform polyhedra, but has not been proven for the uniform tilings. Indeed Branko Grünbaum, J. C. P. Miller, and G. C. Shephard list fifteen more non-Wythoffian uniform tilings in Uniform Tilings with Hollow Tiles (1981):

There are two tilings each for the vertex figures 4.8.4/3.8.4/3.∞ and 4.8/3.4.8/3.4/3.∞; they use the same sets of vertices and edges, but have a different set of squares. There exists also a third tiling for each of these two vertex figure that is only pseudo-uniform (all vertices look alike, but they come in two symmetry orbits). Hence, for Euclidean tilings, the vertex configuration does not uniquely determine the tiling.
In the pictures below, the included squares with horizontal and vertical edges are marked with a central dot. A single square has edges highlighted.

Grünbaum, Miller, and Shephard also list 33 uniform tilings using zigzags (skew apeirogons) as faces, ten of which are families that have a free parameter (the angle of the zigzag). In eight cases this parameter is continuous; in two, it is discrete.

Hyperbolic tilings
The set of triangles tiling the hyperbolic plane is infinite. Moreover in hyperbolic space the fundamental domain does not have to be a simplex. Consequently a full listing of the uniform tilings of the hyperbolic plane cannot be given.

Even when restricted to convex tiles, it is possible to find multiple tilings with the same vertex configuration: see for example Snub order-6 square tiling#Related polyhedra and tiling.

A few small convex cases (not involving ideal faces or vertices) have been given below:

References

 
 

Richard Klitzing: Polyhedra by
point-group symmetry
complexity
Schwarz triangles part 1, part 2
Euclidean tessellations and honeycombs
Hyperbolic tessellations and honeycombs

The tables are based on those presented by Klitzing at his site.

External links
Jim McNeill:
Tessellations of the Plane
Zvi Har'El:
Uniform Solution for Uniform Polyhedra
Hironori Sakamoto:
Uniform Tessellations on the Euclid plane

Uniform polyhedra
Uniform tilings